Samantha Logic (born October 22, 1992) is an American basketball player.  She also played for the San Antonio Stars of the Women's National Basketball Association (WNBA). She played college basketball at the University of Iowa.  A 5'9" point guard from Racine, Wisconsin, Logic played for the Hawkeyes from 2011 to 2015, earning All-American honors in her senior season.  Logic was named a third-team All-American by the Associated Press and a first-team All-American by the United States Basketball Writers Association after averaging 13.4 points, 7.0 rebounds and 8.1 assists per game.  Logic also received the Senior CLASS Award for the 2014–15 season.

Iowa  statistics

Source

WNBA Draft 2015 
Logic was one of 12 players selected by the WNBA to attend the 2015 draft. She is the first player from the University of Iowa to be invited to attend the event. Logic was chosen by the Atlanta dream as the 10th choice in the 2015 WNBA Draft. She was subsequently traded to the San Antonio Stars for a 2016 second round draft pick.

See also
 List of NCAA Division I basketball career triple-doubles leaders

References

External links
Iowa Hawkeyes bio

1992 births
Living people
All-American college women's basketball players
American women's basketball players
Atlanta Dream draft picks
Atlanta Dream players
Basketball players from Wisconsin
Iowa Hawkeyes women's basketball players
McDonald's High School All-Americans
Parade High School All-Americans (girls' basketball)
Point guards
San Antonio Stars players
Sportspeople from Racine, Wisconsin